Originally from the small country town of La Galana, near San Francisco de Macoris, Edilio Paredes is one of the most influential figures in the development of the Dominican music tradition of bachata. In a career now spanning over 40 years, Edilio has
arranged and recorded lead guitar on well over a thousand tracks, accompanying some of bachata's most well known singers. His style
helped influence the emergence of bachata from its predecessor: bolero.

Edilio picked up his first guitar at the age of three, and by the time he was eight had formed a group with his brother, Nelson, and
childhood friend Ramón Cordero, playing the music of Odilio Gonzalez and Julio Jaramillo, amongst others. At thirteen, he moved to the capital, Santo Domingo, and found work at a music store owned by singer Cuco Valoy, who also owned a record label.  Eventually, Edilio started recording for him, and soon became one of the most sought after guitarists to record bolero campesino, later known as bachata.

After some time, he began recording for Radhames Aracena, the owner of Radio Guarachita, the only radio station in the
Dominican Republic featuring guitar music, all of which was recorded by Aracena's own labels.  It was during the 1970s, at
Radio Guarachita, that bachata was beginning to develop as its own musical genre.  The güira replaced the maracas, and elements
of merengue and son, which were more upbeat, began to be incorporated.  Being the principal arranger and guitarist of bachata
during this time, Edilio's influence was significant.

Today, Paredes is a working musician; as a leading member of the groups Super Uba and Puerto Plata, he is bringing bachata to a whole new audience.  He appears on a CD entitled Bachata Roja that was recently released.  He was a part of the Bachata Roja tour with the likes of musicians El Chivo Sin Ley, Leonardo Paniagua, an up-and-coming bachatero Joan Soriano.

External links
Edilio Paredes & The Birth of Bachata Guitar

Bachata musicians
Year of birth missing (living people)
Living people
20th-century Dominican Republic male singers
21st-century Dominican Republic male singers